Moscow University is a  tanker, which was ordered in 1997. The ship is notable for being captured by Somali pirates on 5 May 2010 and rescued the following day by a Russian Navy warship.

Description
Moscow University was ordered in February 1997. The ship was constructed by NKK Corporation, Tsu, Japan, at a cost of $42,260,000. Built as hull number 185, it was launched on 19 December 1998 and delivered to her owners on 26 March 1999.

Moscow University is allocated the IMO Number 9166417 and uses the call sign ELWE8.

History

Moscow University was built for Fancy Maritime SA, which is owned by Novoship Novorossiysk, Russia. The ship was managed by Novoship (UK) Ltd., but management was transferred back to Russia in 2008, when many London-based employees of Novoship (U.K.) Ltd. were (starting in May 2008) made redundant. In December 2009, it was the first ship to leave Kozmino, Russia, with a cargo of oil, and was bound for Hong Kong.

Hijack and rescue

The crew locked themselves in the ship's radar room or engine room. The   was sent to assist Moscow University. 

On 6 May 2010, the Russian destroyer Marshal Shaposhnikov arrived and fired two warning shots. The rescue operation then began when Marshal Shaposhnikov opened fire on the pirates with its cannons. Under the cover of this fire, a helicopter from the ship landed on the hijacked ship's deck and inserted Naval Infantry commandos on board, who quickly rescued the hijacked vessel. The entire crew escaped unharmed. One pirate was killed and  10 detained during the operation. According to sources within the Russian Ministry of Defense, they did not reach the coast and likely died at sea. The pirates' disappearance has raised speculation that they were in fact executed by the Russian commandos, particularly in the light of Russian President Dmitri Medvedev's comments that "We'll have to do what our forefathers did when they met the pirates".

References

External links 

Servicemen who freed Russian tanker to be nominated for awards (RIA Novosti)

 

1998 ships
Merchant ships of Liberia
Oil tankers
Piracy in Somalia
Maritime incidents in 2010